The 2015–16 F4 Chinese Championship season (Castrol Cup FIA F4 CHINESE CHAMPIONSHIP) was the inaugural season of the F4 Chinese Championship. It began on 5 July 2015 at the Goldenport Park Circuit in Beijing and finished on 10 January 2016 at the Zhuhai International Circuit after five double header rounds.

Teams and drivers

Race calendar and results
 A six–round provisional calendar was revealed on 28 February 2015. In April, the scheduled season-opening round – that was due to be held at Zhuhai – was cancelled, with the season being shortened to five rounds. The then scheduled first round at Chengdu in June was also cancelled, and a new round at Zhuhai was added to be the season-ending round in January 2016. All rounds will be held in China.

Championship standings
Points were awarded as follows:

Drivers' standings

Footnotes

References

External links
  

F4 Chinese Championship seasons
Chinese
Chinese
F4 Championship
F4 Championship
Chinese F4
Chinese F4